Saint James Central is a parliamentary constituency represented in the House of Representatives of the Jamaican Parliament. It elects one Member of Parliament (MP) by the first past the post system of election. The constituency was first contested in the 1967 general election. The current MP is Heroy Clarke of the Jamaica Labour Party who has been in office since 2016.

Boundaries 

The constituency covers four electoral divisions – sections of Montego Bay North, Montego Bay South, Montego Bay West and Montego Bay South East, as well as Salt Spring.

Members of Parliament

1967 to 1976

2011 to present

Elections

Elections from 2000 to Present

Elections from 1962 to 1979

See also
 Politics of Jamaica
 Elections in Jamaica

References

Parliamentary constituencies of Jamaica